Kazehakase was a web browser for Unix-like operating systems that uses the GTK+ libraries. Kazehakase embeds the Gecko layout engine as well as GTK+ WebKit.

The browser is named after the short story "Kazehakase" by the Japanese author Ango Sakaguchi; its literal meaning is "Dr. Wind" (a PhD rather than a medical doctor).

Features
Notable features include:
Support for RSS as well as its Japanese variants LIRS and HINA-DI
Drag-and-drop of browser tabs
Mouse gestures
Import of bookmarks from Mozilla Firefox, Mozilla Application Suite, Netscape Browser, Galeon, Konqueror, and w3m; shared bookmarks (with XBEL)
"Smart Bookmarks" programmable with regular expressions
Full text search in browser history

References

External links
Kazehakase project on OSDN
Review (unspecified date) of version 0.3 
Review (March 2007) of unspecified version
Review (April 2007) of version 0.4.5

Gopher clients
POSIX web browsers
Free web browsers
Gecko-based software
News aggregator software
Web browsers that use GTK